John Rednall (born 1964) is a former English international lawn bowler and indoor bowls player. He announced his retirement from international bowls in May 2022 and earned over 100 caps for England.

Bowls career

World Outdoor Championships
Rednall won a bronze medal in the men's fours at the 2004 World Outdoor Bowls Championship in Ayr.

Commonwealth Games
He represented England in the fours event, at the 1994 Commonwealth Games in Victoria, British Columbia, Canada.

National
He was the 2003 National Champion in the pairs and subsequently won the British Isles Pairs in 2004.  He is also an English and British Junior champion, National Champion of Champions, twice been a National Top Club champion, National Two Fours champion and National Top Four winner for Suffolk. He is also an indoor bowls player and won the EIBA National Singles in 2004.

Personal life
He is the director of the Felixstowe and Suffolk Bowling Club. His daughter Katherine Rednall is an indoor world champion.

References

English male bowls players
Living people
1964 births
Bowls players at the 1994 Commonwealth Games
Commonwealth Games competitors for England